Zender is a surname. Notable people with the surname include:

Bill Zender (born 1955), American author, business executive, consultant and speaker
Carlos Bazán Zender (1937–2019), Peruvian medical doctor and politician
Gladys Zender (born 1939), Peruvian model and beauty queen
Hans Zender (1936–2019), German conductor and composer
Stuart Zender (born 1974), British bassist

See also
Zenderman